The Horn (or Saddleback Horn) is a mountain located in Franklin County, Maine. The Horn is flanked to the southwest by the main summit of Saddleback Mountain, to the northeast by Saddleback Junior, and to the northwest by Potato Nubble.

The Horn drains to the northeast into Redington Stream, then into the South Branch of the Dead River, the Kennebec River, and into the Gulf of Maine. The Horn drains to the west into Saddleback Lake, then into Redington Stream. The Horn drains to the south into Winship Stream, then into Conant Stream, Orbeton Stream, and the Sandy River, another tributary of the Kennebec. The Horn drains to the southeast into Hardy Stream, then into Orbeton Stream.

The Appalachian Trail, a  National Scenic Trail from Georgia to Maine, runs along the ridge of Saddleback, including the summit of The Horn.

References

See also 
 List of mountains in Maine

Mountains on the Appalachian Trail
Horn
Horn